William Vincent Rodaway (born 26 September 1954) is an English former professional footballer who made more than 400 appearances in the Football League playing as a central defender for Burnley, Peterborough United, Blackpool and Tranmere Rovers.

References

External links

1954 births
Living people
Footballers from Liverpool
English footballers
Association football defenders
Burnley F.C. players
Peterborough United F.C. players
Blackpool F.C. players
Tranmere Rovers F.C. players
English Football League players
English football managers
Accrington Stanley F.C. managers